Bethapudi is a village in Guntur district of the Indian state of Andhra Pradesh. It is located in Repalle mandal of Tenali revenue division.

Government and politics 

Bethapudi gram panchayat is the local self-government of the village. It is divided into wards and each ward is represented by a ward member. The elected members of the gram panchayat is headed by a sarpanch.

See also 
List of villages in Guntur district

References 

Villages in Guntur district